Park Byung-joo (born 20 February 1942) is a former Korean football manager.

Club career

International career 
Between 1969 and 1973, he was a member of the South Korea national football team.

Managerial career 
After retirement as a player, he returned to Seoul Bank FC as a manager.
Under his guidance the Korea Seoul Bank FC became a strong team in the semi-professional league. He was particularly famous for his late football career. He started his football career during military service.

In 1993, he became a commentator on a sports magazine, but he returned to the K League as a manager of FC Seoul, then known as Anyang LG Cheetahs in December 1997. 
When he was manager, FC Seoul won the FA Cup in 1998. He retired to on December, 1998 and appointed to technical advisor in 1999

Honours
Managerial
 Anyang LG Cheetahs
FA Cup : 1998

References

 Monthly Football Magazine Besteleven 1997.01

1942 births
Living people
South Korean footballers
South Korean football managers
FC Seoul managers
K League 1 managers
Asian Games medalists in football
Footballers at the 1970 Asian Games
Asian Games gold medalists for South Korea
Association football defenders
Medalists at the 1970 Asian Games
Sportspeople from South Chungcheong Province